The Reverdin needle is a surgical instrument designed to pass through a surgical suture and is named after the Swiss surgeon Jacques-Louis Reverdin. Over time, several modifications have been made to the needle and its name.

References

Surgical instruments